The 1983 Washington Huskies football team was an American football team that represented the University of Washington during the 1983 NCAA Division I-A football season.  In its ninth season under head coach Don James, the team was 8–3 in the regular season (5–2 in the Pacific-10 Conference, second), and outscored its opponents 285 to 178.

The Huskies shut out USC 24–0 to improve to 8–2, were ranked fifteenth in the AP poll, with the inside track to the Rose Bowl. They dropped their final two games, the Apple Cup in Seattle, and the Aloha Bowl to Penn State.

Senior quarterback Steve Pelluer was selected as the team's most valuable player.  Pelluer, Dean Browning, Stewart Hill, and Rick Mallory were the team captains.

Schedule

Roster

Game summaries

Navy

USC

vs. Penn State (Aloha Bowl)

NFL Draft
Three Huskies were selected in the 1984 NFL Draft.

References

Washington
Washington Huskies football seasons
Washington Huskies football